Buon Natale... buon anno (internationally released as Merry Christmas... Happy New Year) is a 1989 Italian comedy drama film directed by Luigi Comencini. It is based on the 1986 novel with the same name by Pasquale Festa Campanile. For this film Virna Lisi was awarded with a Silver Ribbon for best actress. The film was coproduced with France where it was released as Joyeux Noël, bonne année.

Plot

Cast
Virna Lisi as  Elvira
Michel Serrault as  Gino
Consuelo Ferrara as Patrizia
Paolo Graziosi as 	Pietro
Tiziana Pini as Giannina
Mattia Sbragia as Giorgio 
Francesca Neri  as the girl in the pullman

See also  
 List of Christmas films  
 List of Italian films of 1989

References

External links

1989 films
Films directed by Luigi Comencini
1980s Christmas comedy-drama films
Films about old age
Films set in Rome
Italian Christmas comedy-drama films
Films scored by Fiorenzo Carpi
1980s Italian-language films
1980s Italian films